Beongeoli Sam-ryong (Deaf Sam-ryong) is a 1929 Korean film written, directed, produced by and starring Na Woon-gyu (1902-1937). It premiered at the Choseon Theater in January 1929. It was the fifth film produced by Na Woon-gyu Productions, and its failure with the public was blamed for the bankruptcy of that company.

Plot summary 
The plot concerns Sam-ryong, a deaf servant who is in love with his landlord's daughter-in-law. Critics praised the final scene of the film, in which the house burns, as a work of pioneering and experimental film making.

1964 remake 
In 1964 Shin Sang-ok directed Deaf Sam-yong, a remake of Beongeoli Sam-ryong which won the Grand Bell (Daejong) Award in 1965 for Best Picture.

See also
 List of Korean-language films
 Cinema of Korea

External links 
 
 Images from Beongeoli Sam-ryong at The Korean Film Archive (KOFA)
 A Deaf, Sam-ryong (Beong-eoli Samryong) at The Korean Film Archive (KOFA)
 

1929 films
Pre-1948 Korean films
Korean silent films
Korean black-and-white films
Films directed by Na Woon-gyu
South Korean drama films
1929 drama films
Silent drama films
Films about disability